Gucci Westman is an American makeup artist, cosmetic designer, and founder of cosmetics line Westman Atelier. She is known for her chic and minimalistic looks, natural and dewy makeup, and clean-based lifestyle. 

She is one of the BoF's 500, a professional index of the people shaping the fashion industry, hand-selected by the editors of The Business of Fashion.

She served as the International Artistic Director of Lancôme from 2003-2007 and Global Artistic Director of Revlon from 2008-2015.

Career

Celebrity work
Westman became known for her makeup work with celebrities, including Drew Barrymore, Natalie Portman, Gwyneth Paltrow, and Cameron Diaz.
While working with Revlon, Westman worked with Halle Berry, Jessica Alba, Elle Macpherson, Jennifer Connelly, and Jessica Biel. She served as a makeup artist or makeup supervisor for several Hollywood movies including Being John Malkovich, Buffalo '66 and French Exit. Westman had a cameo role in the film version of Sex and the City in 2008.

Magazine covers
Westman styled the cosmetic looks of cover models such as Reese Witherspoon, Taylor Swift, Jennifer Aniston, Kim Kardashian, Cameron Diaz, and Nicole Kidman for Allure, Vogue, and W covers in the United States and Australia. She also modeled for an article in Vogue's January 2011 issue.

Runway work
Westman has done the makeup of runway models for Oscar de la Renta, Richard Chai, Diane von Furstenberg, Marchesa, Badgley Mischka, Devi Kroell, John Patrick, Ecco Domani and Rag & Bone during New York Fashion Week and Antonio Berardi during London Fashion Week.

Cosmetic design
Westman was hired by Lancôme in 2003 as the brand's International Artistic Director. Her responsibilities included representing the brand at fashion and beauty events, styling models for company advertising shoots, and designing cosmetic color collections for the label. In 2008, Westman began a new, similar career as the Global Artistic Director for Revlon, creating the "Daydreamer" and "Suede Rhapsody" seasonal shade collections. In April 2015, she stepped down from her position at Revlon after seven years. 

Westman launched her own cosmetic line named Westman Atelier in Spring 2018.

Personal life
Westman was born in 1971 in California and grew up in Sweden. Westman was married in 2006 to Rag & Bone fashion designer David Neville. Westman and Neville have three children, Dashel, Gray and Petal.

References

Living people
1971 births
American make-up artists
American people of Swedish descent
Revlon